Zaheer Khan (born 3 December 1979) is a Pakistani former cricketer. He played first-class cricket for several domestic teams in Pakistan between 1998 and 2000. He was also a part of Pakistan's squad for the 1998 Under-19 Cricket World Cup.

References

External links
 

1979 births
Living people
Pakistani cricketers
Lahore cricketers
Sargodha cricketers
Water and Power Development Authority cricketers
Cricketers from Lahore